Rašica may refer to: 

In Serbia:
Rašica, Serbia, a village in the Municipality of Blace

In Slovenia:
Rašica, Ljubljana, a settlement in the  City Municipality of Ljubljana
Rašica, Velike Lašče, a settlement in the Municipality of Velike Lašče

Serbo-Croatian place names